Ma'ad ibn Adnan is an ancient ancestor of Qusai ibn Kilab and his descendant the Islamic prophet Muhammad. He is featured in ancient Arabic literature.

Origin
According to traditions, Ma'ad is the son of Adnan, the father of a group of the Ishmaelite Arabs who inhabited West and Northern Arabia. Adnan is believed by Arab genealogies to be the father of many Ishmaelite tribes along the Western Hijaz coast of the Arabian peninsula and Najd.

As it was reported, Ma'ad was first born of Adnan, his year of birth being 598 BCE.

Family
Ma'ad was the father of four sons: Nizar, Quda'a, Qunus and Iyad. Quda'a was the first-born and so Ma'ad ibn Adnan was known by his Kunya "Abu Quda'a."

History

In Pre-Islamic Arabia
From the poems composed by Pre-Islamic poets, and from their statements, it can be concluded that Ma'ad was more venerated and more important than his father Adnan, evidenced by the number of times when he was mentioned in Pre-Islamic poetries, and how he was described and honored by his descendants' tribes when boasting against other tribes, some other poets even considered it as "disgrace" not to be a descendant of Adnan and Ma'ad.

Some other poems also celebrated and honored the victory of the people of Ma'ad against the tribe of Madh'hij in South Arabia.

When the Babylonian king Nebuchadnezzar II attacked the Qedarite Arabs during the time of Adnan, Ma'ad was sent away by his father, and after the defeat of the Qedarite and the death of both Adnan and Nebuchadnezzar II, many Adnanites who were not forced to live in Mesopotamia have fled away to Yemen, but Ma'ad, as the successor of his father, ordered them to return to Hijaz and Northern Arabia.

The defeat and displacement of the people of Ma'ad seemed to be viewed by Pre-Islamic Arabs as a disastrous event, so that it was used as a proverbial measure in describing the horror of their later defeats.

In Pre-Islamic Poetry

Ma'ad, unlike his father, was mentioned countless times by Pre-Islamic Arab poets across the whole Arabian Peninsula, including Ghassanid and Christian poets,  even in the famous Seven Mu'allaqat.

From those poems, it can be seen that Ma'ad was venerated by Pre-Islamic Arabs, and for some reason, they believed that all the glories throughout the whole Arab history is considered nothing when compared to the glory of Ma'ad.

From some other poems, it appears that the nation of Ma'ad presented a large majority among Pre-Islamic Arabs.

In Nabataean Inscriptions

Ma'ad was mentioned by name in the Namara inscription as a nation that was conquered by the Lakhmid king Imru' al-Qays ibn 'Amr, along with other Arab nation from North, Central-West and South Arabia.

From some of the reports of about the relations between the Lakhmids and the nation of Ma'ad, it can be concluded that the kings of the Northern Arab kingdoms feared them and viewed them as mighty opponent because of their powerful war tactics, even when they conquered them, they treated their kings with high respect as important people, and gave them large conquered colonies to rule, as reported in the Namara inscription. Such views are also supported by the Classical Arabic writings.

In Roman-Byzantine Writings

The nation of Ma'ad was mentioned by the Byzantine historian Procopius of Caesarea (c. 500 CE – c. 565 CE) in his historical record of the wars of Justinian I.

He mentioned that a Saracen nation named "Maddeni" (Ma'ad) were subjects with the kingdom of the "Homeritae" (Himyarites), and that Justinian sent a letter to the Himyarite king ordering him to assemble an army of Himyarite soldiers and from Ma'ad under the leadership of a king of the nation of Ma'ad named "Kaisus" (Qays), in order to attack the borders of the Sasanian Empire, and then approved the leader of Ma'ad as a king on the region.

The tradition of Ibn Ishaq states that Muhammad was the son of 'Abdullah, b. 'Abdu'I-Muttalib (whose name
was Shayba), b. Hashim (whose name was 'Amr), b. Abd Manaf (whose
name was al-Mughira), b. Qusay (whose name was Zayd), b. Kilab, b.
Murrah, b. Ka'b, b. Lu'ayy, b. Ghalib, b. Fihr, b. Malik, b. al-Nadr, b.
Kinana, b. Khuzayma, b. Mudrika (whose name was 'Amir), b. Ilyas,
b. Mudar, b. Nizar, b. Ma'add, b. Adnan, b. Udd (or Udad),....b. Ya'rub, b. Yashjub, b. Qedar, b. Isma'il, b. Ibrahim, the friend of the Compassionate.

See also
Ishmael
Ishmaelites
Qedarite
Iyad (tribe)

References 

Adnanites
Ancient Arabs
Pre-Islamic Arabia
Ancestors of Muhammad
6th-century BC Arabs